Father Reiner Schürmann, O.P., Ph.D. (February 4, 1941 – August 20, 1993) was a German Dominican priest and philosopher. From 1975 to his death, he was Professor in the department of philosophy of the Graduate Faculty of the New School for Social Research in New York City. He wrote all his major published work in French.

Biography 
Born in Amsterdam in 1941 of German parents, Reiner Schürmann studied philosophy and theology with the Dominicans of Le Centre d'études du Saulchoir near Paris, between 1962 and 1969, and received a Doctorate in Philosophy from the University of Sorbonne in Paris in 1981.

It was as a Dominican priest that he first came to the United States in 1971, teaching first at The Catholic University of America in Washington, D.C., then at Duquesne University in Pittsburgh. In 1975, he left the priesthood and began teaching philosophy at the New School for Social Research as a protégé of Hannah Arendt and Hans Jonas.

He "died of complications caused by AIDS on August 20, 1993 in New York City", three years after his partner, Québécois painter Louis Comtois.

Work 
One of Schürmann's best-known works is Heidegger on Being and Acting: From Principles to Anarchy (1990 reprint ). In this work, Schürmann reflects on the difference between the findings of Heidegger the thinker and the beliefs of Heidegger the man, and incidentally shows Heidegger's intellectual honesty in following these thoughts in spite of his personal upbringing and beliefs.

In his only literary work, Les Origines, which was awarded the Prix Broquette-Gonin by the Académie Française in 1977, he provides an autobiographical account of a pilgrimage of errancy, a search for redemption from the inauthentic thrownness of a past filled with memories of guilt and despair, of being born German during World War II, "too late to see the war, too early to forget it."

In 1996, the French philosopher Gérard Granel published posthumously the French original of Schürmann's monumental work Broken Hegemonies ("Des Hégémonies brisées", Mauvezin, T.E.R., 1996).

Published works  
Maître Eckhart et la joie errante ("Master Eckhart and the Wandering Joy", 1972; translated into English as Meister Eckhart: Mystic and philosopher, 1978) 
Les Origines ("Origins", 1977) 
Le Principe d'anarchie: Heidegger et la question de l'agir, 1982; tr. From Principles to Anarchy: Heidegger on Being and Acting (1987) 
''Des Hégémonies brisées, posthumous publication, 1996; tr. Broken Hegemonies, 2003).
Meister Eckhart: German mystic by Father Reiner Schürmann, O.P. on Britannica

References

External links 
Granel devoted to Schürmann's testament a study: "Untameable Singularity (Some Remarks on Broken Hegemonies)".
 Homepage giving access to publications
 2015 article by Mario Kopić about Reiner Schürmann 

1941 births
1993 deaths
Dutch emigrants to the United States
Dutch Dominicans
University of Paris alumni
Duquesne University faculty
Philosophy academics
Catholic University of America faculty
Heidegger scholars
Clergy from Amsterdam
Dutch people of German descent
AIDS-related deaths in New York (state)
20th-century American historians
Winners of the Prix Broquette-Gonin (literature)
Christian continental philosophers and theologians